Ron Michels (born 23 July 1965) is a Dutch badminton player. Michels competed in two events at the 1996 Summer Olympics.

References

External links
 

1965 births
Living people
Dutch male badminton players
Olympic badminton players of the Netherlands
Badminton players at the 1996 Summer Olympics
Place of birth missing (living people)